The Unterbächhorn is the highest summit overlooking Belalp in the canton of Valais. It is located in the Bernese Alps, south of the Nesthorn, on a ridge consisting of several higher but unnamed summits.

At its south-eastern flanks lies a glacier named Unnerbächgletscher.

References

External links 
 Unterbächhorn on Hikr.org

Mountains of the Alps
Bernese Alps
Alpine three-thousanders
Mountains of Valais
Mountains of Switzerland